Ludovico Mattioli (1662-1747) was an Italian painter and engraver.

Biography
He was born in Crevalcore, but mainly active in Bologna. He was known for his depictions of landscapes, both in engravings and frescoes. He also painted a few oil canvases. He was a friend of Giuseppe Maria Crespi, and engraved some of Crespi's works. Mattioli was a member of Accademia Clementina.

References

1662 births
1747 deaths
People from Crevalcore
17th-century Italian painters
Italian male painters
Italian engravers
18th-century Italian painters
Italian Baroque painters
Painters from Bologna
Italian landscape painters
18th-century Italian male artists